Omar Yaisien (Arabic: عمر ياسين; born 8 May 2000) is a professional footballer who plays as a midfielder for Al-Hamriyah. Born in France, he represents Egypt internationally.

International career
Yaisien was called up to represent the Egypt U23s in a friendly match against the Netherlands U21 in March 2019.

Personal life
Yaisien was born in France to an Egyptian father and Algerian mother. He is the younger brother of the footballer Abdallah Yaisien.

Career statistics

References

External links

2000 births
Living people
Egyptian footballers
Egypt youth international footballers
French footballers
Egyptian people of Algerian descent
French people of Egyptian descent
French sportspeople of Algerian descent
French expatriate footballers
Egyptian expatriate footballers
Association football midfielders
UAE Pro League players
UAE First Division League players
Al Ain FC players
Al Hamriyah Club players
Expatriate footballers in the United Arab Emirates
French expatriate sportspeople in the United Arab Emirates
Egyptian expatriate sportspeople in the United Arab Emirates